Lakewood Ranch is a planned community and census-designated place in southeastern Manatee County and northeastern Sarasota County, Florida, United States, consisting of approximately . It is part of the North Port-Bradenton-Sarasota, Florida Metropolitan Statistical Area.

According to the 2020 census, the census-designated place had a population of 34,877.

History

The area originally was assembled in 1905 by John Schroeder as Schroeder-Manatee Ranch (SMR). The land was purchased by members of Milwaukee's Uihlein family in 1922 for ranch operations such as timber and cattle.

The airport authority struck down the idea in 1985 and expanded the existing airport facility. The airport proposal and the construction of Interstate 75 resulted in SMR's board of directors to pursue creating a planned community for the land.

In the 1980s, SMR designed a destination resort project called Cypress Banks. The project and development of regional impact (DRI) were initially denied by Manatee County in 1987 but later approved in December 1989. The project never broke ground and SMR maintained vested rights to the land. The first neighborhood development, Summerfield, was built and completed in 1995.

Geography
Lakewood Ranch is in southern Manatee County and extends south into Sarasota County.

The Braden River flows east to west through the southern part of the community, eventually leading northwest to the Manatee River in the northeast part of Bradenton.

Demographics
According to the 2020 United States census, Lakewood Ranch had a population of 34,877 with 11,096 households. There were 2.64 persons per household and 79.8% lived in the same house as 1 year prior. The population per square mile was 756.9. 

5.1% of the population was under 5 years old, 20.2% were under 18 years old, and 29.9% were 65 years or older. 49.9% of the population were female. 

86.7% of the population was white, 2.0% was black or African American, 1.5% was American Indian or Alaska Native, 1.9% was Asian, 0.1% was Native Hawaiian and other Pacific Islander, 6.7% were two or more races, and 9.5% were Hispanic or Latino. There were 2,378 veterans in the city and 12.2% of the population were foreign born.

The median value of owner-occupied housing units was $474,600. The median selected monthly owner costs with a mortgage was $2,544. The median selected monthly owner costs without a mortgage was $918. The median gross rent was $1,899. The median household income was $110,026 and the per capita income was $56,393. 6.3% of the population lived behold the Poverty threshold. 

98.8% of the households had a computer and 95.1% had a broadband internet subscription. 97.9% of the population over the age of 25 had a highschool degree or higher. 56.1% of that same population had a Bachelor's degree or higher.

Government
Lakewood Ranch was established as a development of regional impact (DRI), as defined in Section 380.06 of the Florida Statutes, in December 1989. The master-planned community is maintained through the Lakewood Ranch Stewardship District and five community development districts (CDD) within the District. The District was established on June 14, 2005, by the Florida legislature. The District encompasses  within Manatee and Sarasota counties. The CDD's main powers are to plan, finance, construct, operate, and maintain community-wide infrastructure and services specifically for the benefit of its residents.

The Lakewood Ranch Inter-District Authority (IDA) was created to operate Town Hall and provide administrative, financial, and operations/maintenance services to the Lakewood Ranch CDDs. The IDA is composed of one representative from each CDD.

Education
Schools located within Lakewood Ranch:

Public schools 
 B.D. Gullett Elementary School
 Braden River Elementary School
 Braden River Middle School
 Carlos E. Haile Middle School
 Dr. Mona Jain Middle School
 Freedom Elementary School
 Gilbert W. McNeal Elementary School
 Imagine School Lakewood Ranch
 Lakewood Ranch High School
 Lakewood Ranch Preparatory Academy 
 R. Dan Nolan Middle School
 Robert E. Willis Elementary School

Private schools 
 Out-of-Door Academy
 Pinnacle Academy
 Risen Savior Academy

College 
 State College of Florida, Manatee–Sarasota
 Lake Erie College of Osteopathic Medicine (LECOM)
 Keiser University

Vocational school 
 Manatee Technical College
 Meridian College

Notable people
 Harber H. Hall (1920–2020), member of the Illinois Senate from 1973 to 1979. He resided in Lakewood Ranch at the time of his death.
 Erika Tymrak, soccer player
 Dick Vitale, basketball broadcaster

References

External links
Lakewood Ranch Resident Forum
Corporate website

Planned communities in Florida
Populated places established in 1994
1994 establishments in Florida
Census-designated places in Sarasota County, Florida
Census-designated places in Manatee County, Florida
Uihlein Family